Vicar Street is a concert, performing arts centre and events venue in Dublin, Ireland. Located on Thomas Street, Dublin 8, Vicar Street has capacity for 1,050 people for seated performances and 1,500 people for standing gigs. The venue is owned by Harry Crosbie and operated by Peter Aiken.
Since opening in 1998, the venue has become a popular setting for a wide range of acts including stand-up comedy, drama performances and a variety of concerts. The first artist to play on the Vicar Street Stage was local singer/songwriter Shay Cotter. Major international recording artists have performed in Vicar Street, such as Bob Dylan in 2000, Neil Young in 2003, Adele in 2008, Paul Simon and Ed Sheeran in 2011, and Lana Del Rey in 2013.

Because of its intimate size, the venue is one looked on with warmth by fans and acts alike.

Notable events

Longest-running solo show
The longest-running show to take place in Vicar Street was Tommy Tiernan's Loose show with a string of 166 performances.

Other events

Vicar Street hosts the Choice Music Prize ceremony in February/March each year. Occasionally the venue is used to accommodate higher attendances than expected at smaller venues. In 2008, Canadian indie rock band Wolf Parade's November show which had been scheduled for Andrew's Lane Theatre was moved to Vicar Street.

Bob Dylan performed at the venue in 2000 for his first, and as yet, only gig at the venue.

Lankum have played here many times with the nights known for their debauchery, general mayhem and off kilter vibes.

Gary Numan played his first concert in Ireland here in 2001.

Planxty played a series of concerts at the venue on 30 & 31 January and on 4 & 5, 11 & 12 February 2004, which were recorded and from which selected material was released on the CD Live 2004 and its associated DVD.

Bell X1 played two shows in November 2008 to celebrate the venue's tenth anniversary. In March 2009, the Irish Anti-War Movement hosted a fund-raising event at Vicar Street, featuring Christy Moore, Stephen Rea, Sinéad Cussack, Róisín Elsafy, Mick Pyro, Judith Mok and Joyce. A Musicians For Marriage Equality show featuring artists such as Michele Ann Kelly and The Spikes took place at Vicar Street in October 2009.

"Weird Al" Yankovic played his first, and so far only, concert in Ireland here on October 26, 2015, during the Mandatory World Tour.

Live recordings
Many comedians and musicians, both from Ireland and abroad, have chosen to record some of their live material at the venue. These include Simon Amstell, Aslan, Des Bishop, Jason Byrne, Damien Dempsey, The Dubliners, Erasure, The Frames, Andy Irvine's 70th birthday concerts, Kíla, Christy Moore, Dylan Moran, Moving Hearts, Mundy, Planxty, Josh Ritter, Tommy Tiernan, Neil Young, and Foil, Arms & Hog.

Awards 
Vicar Street has been awarded the Live Music Venue of the Year Award, in the national and Dublin-based categories of the IMRO awards, for two years running in 2009 and 2008 – the first two years of the IMRO Music Venue Awards. In addition in 2008, it also received the Hot Press Readers Award for Best Live Music Venue in Ireland.

References

External links
 Official site
 Reviews of various concerts in Vicar Street

Music in Dublin (city)
Music venues in Dublin (city)
Tourist attractions in Dublin (city)
Theatres in Dublin (city)